The Information Affairs Authority (IAA) is Bahrain's ministry of information that was formed in July 2010. The president of IAA is appointed directly by the King of Bahrain and has the rank of a minister in the Bahrain government. From July 2010 to 2012, Fawaz bin Mohammed bin Khalifa Al Khalifa was President of IAA. In 2012, he relinquished the position to take up an appointment as Minister of State for Communication, and Sameera Rajab was appointed in his place.

Responsibilities 
The responsibilities of IAA include:
 controlling the Bahrain News Agency
 controlling the Bahrain Radio and Television Corporation
 regulating press and publications in the country
 acting as the official spokesperson for the government of Bahrain.

IAA is also the press pass issuing authority.

History
It was formed in July 2010 by a decree of King Hamad splitting off the information portfolio of the Ministry of Culture and Information. Prior to the creation of IAA, the information function was performed by Mai bint Mohammed Al Khalifa as part of the Ministry of Culture and Information.

In April 2012, Sameera Rajab, an outspoken supporter of Saddam Hussein, and cousin of human rights defender Nabeel Rajab, was appointed Minister of Information Affairs in the Bahraini government. In 2016, Ali bin Mohammed Al Rumaihi was appointed Minister of Information Affairs.

Independence 
The first president of IAA, between 2010 and 2012, was Fawaz bin Mohammed bin Khalifa Al Khalifa, who is a member of the Al Khalifa ruling family and a cousin of King Hamad and the current Prime Minister of Bahrain, Khalifa bin Salman Al Khalifa.  Prior to being appointed president of IAA, Fawaz served as the president of General Organisation for Youth and Sports.

Fawaz's father, Mohammed bin Khalifa Al Khalifa, served as Bahrain's Interior Minister from 1973 until 2004.

Criticism
In 2011, the Information Affairs Authority came under criticism for its handling of the Bahraini uprising. According to the report issued in November 2011 by the Bahrain Independent Commission of Inquiry:

The IAA was also criticized by Index on Censorship for its attempts to justify media censorship in Bahrain.

Notable people in the IAA
 Fawaz bin Mohammed Al Khalifa
 Abdul Aziz bin Mubarak Al Khalifa
 Maysoon Sabkar
 Luma Bashmi
 Fahad AlBinAli
 Mariam Bukamal

References

External links
 Official website

2010 establishments in Bahrain
Ministries established in 2010
Bahrain
Government ministries of Bahrain
Mass media in Bahrain
Mass media in Isa Town